Hubertine Rose Éholie is an Ivorian retired academic.  Specialising in chemistry she had a long career at the  University of Abidjan.  She retired by 2015 and is a critic of the gender gap of women in academia.

Career 

Hubertine Rose Éholie was born in Burkina Faso, then part of the French colony of Ivory Coast, on 23 May 1934.  She studied at the University of Poitiers and was awarded a higher education certificate in Mathematics, Physics, Chemistry in 1957 and a certificate of specialised studies in metallurgy, chemistry and physics in 1960.  Éholie was awarded Doctor of Engineering Science degree in 1966 and a State Doctorate in 1971 by the University of Abidjan.

Éholie taught at the  before a long career at the University of Abidjan.  She began as a teaching assistant before becoming an assistant lecturer and lecturer in the Faculty of the Sciences.  She became a senior lecturer, professor and then tenured professor Faculty of Sciences and Techniques.  Her specialisms were in crystallography, electro-magnetics, glasses, the silver-arsenic-selenium system, semi-conductors and ternary compounds.  She was elected a fellow of the Third World Academy of Sciences (now known as The World Academy of Sciences, TWAS), Sub-Saharan Africa Region in 1987 and is one of only 88 fellows elected from that region (as of 2017).  She had retired by 2015.

She wrote an article in 1988 for a Canadian International Development Agency and the Third World Academy of Sciences conference entitled "The role of women in the scientific and technological development of the third world: the case of Cote d'Ivoire".  She is a critic of the gender gap of women in academia in the Ivory Coast, particularly in the sciences.

References 

1934 births
Living people
Academic staff of Université Félix Houphouët-Boigny
Ivorian chemists
Ivorian women scientists
Fellows of the African Academy of Sciences
Women chemists
TWAS fellows